South Carolina Highway 329 (SC 329) is a  primary state highway in the U.S. state of South Carolina. It serves as an eastern bypass to the town of Gaffney.

Route description
SC 329 is a two-lane bypass route between SC 105 and SC 18, located east of Gaffney.  It is also known as the Victory Trail Road, as it overlaps with the Overmountain Victory National Historic Trail.

History
SC 329 was established by 1982 as a new primary route between SC 105 and SC 18.

The first SC 329 was established in 1942 as a new primary routing between SC 22 in Glymphville and SC 177. In 1948, it was decommissioned and downgraded to secondary roads S-36-28 and S-40-32.

South Carolina Highway 180

South Carolina Highway 180 (SC 180) was established as a new primary routing between U.S. Route 29 (US 29) and SC 18 northeast of Gaffney. In 1948, it was decommissioned and was downgraded to secondary road S-11-32. Around 1982, most of the former route became part of SC 329.

Junction list

See also

References

External links

 
 Mapmikey's South Carolina Highways Page: SC 329

329
Transportation in Cherokee County, South Carolina